Clonliffe Harriers is a Dublin-based athletics club. They were founded in 1886, and are the oldest athletic club in Ireland. They have been based in Morton Stadium since the 1950s. The club has top-class international coaches in all disciplines and a lively training programme for all levels. The club competes during the winter in cross country and road events. This involves all ages from under 10 to senior, veterans and all standards. Clonliffe also hosts the oldest road race in Ireland, the 'Clonliffe 2 mile', which takes place through Glasnevin every April.

Notable members
Clonliffe Harriers has been home to many nationally and internationally renowned athletes, in both track and field disciplines and cross-country.
Alistair Cragg
Niall Bruton
Brian Gregan

Achievements
Clonliffe has won the National Senior Cross-Country Title more often than any other club, winning in:2009, 2008, 2007, 2006, 2005, 2004, 2000, 1992, 1991, 1989, 1988, 1987, 1986, 1984, 1982, 1981, 1980, 1977 and 1976. They have been runners up in: 2002, 2001, 1996, 1993, 1990, 1985, 1983 and 1972.

National Road Relay (Senior Men) Champions: 2006
National Half Marathon (Senior Men) Champions: 2006
National Marathon (Ladies) Champions: 2004, 2005
National Ladies Intermediate Cross-Country Champions: 2005
National Senior Cross Country Championships: 2009, 2008, 2007, 2006, 2005, 2004, 2003.
National Junior Cross Country Championships: 2009, 1983
National Track & field League:2009, 2008

Clonliffe 2 Mile
The Clonliffe 2 mile is a road race held every year. It is sponsored by Kavanagh's Pub on Prospect Square, locally known as "The Grave Diggers". Traditionally, and currently, the race starts at the Bottom of the Hill Pub on Main Street in Finglas. The runners run up past Clearwater Shopping Centre, past Glasnevin Cemetery and down to The Grave Diggers in Glasnevin. This race has been run every year since the late 1800s.

External links
Clonliffe Homepage

Athletics clubs in Ireland
Sports clubs established in 1886
Athletics in Fingal